The Tsingoni Mosque is a mosque in Tsingoni, Mayotte. It is considered the earliest established mosque in France.

History
The exact date of the establishment of the mosque is subject to dispute. One source places the construction of the mosque at 1538. Researchers alternatively date the establishment of the mosque at around 1441. In 1994, a new minaret for the building was erected. In 2016, it mosque was classified as French historical monument. Beginning 2019, the mosque underwent renovation with a cost of €2 million.

See also
 Islam in Mayotte
 List of mosques in France

References

1538 establishments in Mayotte
Monuments historiques of France
Mosques completed in 1538
Mosques in Mayotte